German submarine U-961 was a Type VIIC U-boat built for Nazi Germany's Kriegsmarine during World War II. U-961 was constructed at Hamburg during 1942 and 1943, completing her working-up cruises in the Baltic Sea in the spring of 1944. Due to extensive modifications and shortages of supplies during her construction and training, U-961 took nearly two years to be ready for active service, an exceptionally long time.

Design
German Type VIIC submarines were preceded by the shorter Type VIIB submarines. U-961 had a displacement of  when at the surface and  while submerged. She had two shafts and two  propellers.

U-961 was fitted with five  torpedo tubes (four fitted at the bow and one at the stern), fourteen torpedoes, one  SK C/35 naval gun, 220 rounds, and one twin  C/30 anti-aircraft gun. The boat had a complement of between forty-four and sixty.

Service history

War patrol
U-961 departed on her only war patrol on 23 March 1944, under the command of Oberleutnant zur See Klaus Fischer, a veteran submariner. After leaving Marvika at Kristiansand in Norway, U-961 headed directly for the North Atlantic Ocean, the main battleground of the Battle of the Atlantic. By 1944 however, the region had become a U-boat graveyard, as drastic improvements in submarine detection and destruction had been made, both by surface shipping and by allied aircraft.

Fate
As U-961 approached the convoy, she was discovered underwater by the detection equipment on the convoy escort  and immediately destroyed with depth charges, at position . The boat never even managed to surface, sinking to the bottom with all 49 sailors on board.

References

Bibliography

External links

World War II submarines of Germany
German Type VIIC submarines
World War II shipwrecks in the Norwegian Sea
U-boats commissioned in 1943
U-boats sunk in 1944
1942 ships
Ships built in Hamburg
U-boats sunk by depth charges
U-boats sunk by British warships
Ships lost with all hands
Maritime incidents in March 1944